Danielle Perez is an American stand-up comic, actor, and writer. She participated in CBS's 2020 Diversity Sketch Comedy Showcase and has credits on ABC's Jimmy Kimmel Live!, MTV's Decoded, NBC's StandUp, and A Little Late with Lilly Singh.

Early life 
Perez grew up in Los Angeles, California. She attended San Francisco State University.

When Perez was 20 years old, she was  hit by a trolley in San Francisco while crossing the street. Her lower legs were amputated and she began using a wheelchair.

She is openly queer.

Career 
Perez appeared on the game show The Price Is Right in 2015 where she won a treadmill. She appeared on Jimmy Kimmel Live! soon after, and Kimmel gave her a trip on a Royal Caribbean Cruise.

Perez has performed comedy at a number of festivals and venues, including SF Sketchfest, Laughing Skull Comedy Festival, and the Brooklyn Comedy Festival. She has opened for many popular comedians, including Maria Bamford, Laurie Kilmartin, and Guy Branum. She participated in CBS's Diversity Sketch Comedy Showcase in 2020 in Los Angeles, a showcase designed to spotlight historically underrepresented voices in comedy. She has credits on MTV's Decoded, NBC's StandUp, and A Little Late with Lilly Singh. She has also filmed sketches for BuzzFeed and voiced characters for Comedy Central.

Perez is committed to accessibility and inclusivity in comedy.

She founded Thigh Gap Comedy with fellow comics Madison Shepard and Danielle Radford. They put on live comedy shows around Los Angeles, including one called GENTRIFICATION in the Highland Park neighborhood.

References

American stand-up comedians
American comedy writers
American democratic socialists
Actors with disabilities
Living people
Year of birth missing (living people)
American LGBT actors
American LGBT comedians